Belgium women's national goalball team is the women's national team of Belgium.  Goalball is a team sport designed specifically for athletes with a vision impairment.  The team takes part in international competitions.

World Championships  

IBSA World Goalball Championships have been held every four years from 1978.  

The 1986 World Championships were held in Roermond, the Netherlands. The team was one of ten teams participating, and they finished ninth overall.

See also 

 Disabled sports 
 Belgium men's national goalball team 
 Belgium at the Paralympics

References

National women's goalball teams
Women's national sports teams of Belgium
European national goalball teams